Mason Tatafu (born 17 April 2002), is an Australian professional footballer who plays as a defender for Hofstra Pride.

Career
Tatafu made his senior debut in July 2020 playing for Perth Glory NPL in National Premier Leagues Western Australia. He made his professional debut on 27 November 2020 against Ulsan Hyundai in the 2020 AFC Champions League. On 20 January 2021, he made his A-League debut, coming on as a substitute for the final few moments of a 5–3 win over Adelaide United.

In August 2021, Tatafu started college at Hofstra University and started playing for Hofstra Pride.

References

External links

NPL stats

2002 births
Living people
Australian soccer players
Association football defenders
Perth Glory FC players
National Premier Leagues players